Tylobolus is a genus of millipedes in the order Spirobolida with seven known species found in western North America. It is in the family Spirobolidae, and is the type genus of the subfamily Tylobolinae. The genus was named by Orator F. Cook in 1904.

Description
They are cylindrical, or nearly so, and possess 40 to 54 segments (body rings) as adults. Body color ranges from black to reddish brown, the posterior margin of each ring may be faintly or strongly colored in red or yellow. The body rings are mostly smooth or with a very fine texture. The two eyes, each composed of 27-50 ocelli in a patch or "ocular field", are widely separated, with more than twice the width of a patch between them.

Species
All species of Tylobolus occur on the Pacific Slope of North America, ranging from Washington state to Baja California, Mexico. Only one species occurs east of the Sierra Nevada mountains.

T. uncigerus is the northernmost species, ranging to just north of the Columbia River in Washington. The southernmost species, T. claremontus, ranges from Los Angeles and western Riverside County to northern Baja.  Most of the Pacific species have small geographic ranges and do not overlap. The only species east of the Sierra Nevada is T. utahensis, which occurs in the Mojave Desert.

An additional species, "T. fredericksoni", was previously thought to occur in Kansas and Nebraska, but its existence is dubious, and may be attributable to Narceus americanus, a spirobolid common in the eastern U.S. Since no specimens of "T. fredericksoni" have been discovered since 1949 and the holotypes are highly fragmented and equivocal, the species is considered a nomen dubium or doubtful name.

Classification

Tylobolus may be one of the most advanced genera of the family Spirobolidae, in terms of a number of traits it possesses that are absent or poorly developed in other spirobolids. Tylobolus is the type genus of the subfamily Tylobolinae which includes one other genus, Hiltonius, occurring from Southern California into Mexico. Of the two, Tylobolus is thought to be the more advanced due to more complex genital morphology, and a prominently hooked projection of the third pair of legs in males. Tylobolinae is thought to be more derived than the other subfamily, Spirobolinae. The family Spirobolidae itself is thought to be the most primitive family of the order Spirobolida.

References

External links

Tylobolus on BugGuide

Millipedes of North America
Spirobolida